Krasnoshchelye is a rural locality (a Selo) in Lovozersky District of Murmansk Oblast, Russia. The village is located beyond the Arctic circle, on the Kola Peninsula. It is 157 m above sea level.

The majority of the population are Izhma Komi and Sami.

The film "The Tundra Race" by German director René Harder portrays the village and its inhabitants. The documentation was launched at the Locarno International Film Festival in 2013.

Climate

References

Rural localities in Murmansk Oblast
Komi peoples